The Weapons of Mass Destruction Directorate (WMDD) is a division of the National Security Branch of the Federal Bureau of Investigation. WMDD addresses and investigates emerging threats the United States faces from the use of weapons of mass destruction. WMDD specifically consolidates all relevant FBI assets under one comprehensive program capable of detecting, deterring, and dismantling WMD programs. In the wake of the September 11, 2001 attacks, the Division's funding and manpower have significantly increased.

Leadership
The Weapons of Mass Destruction Directorate is headed by assistant director, who reports to the executive assistant director of the FBI National Security Branch. The current assistant director is Brian Boetig, who was appointed by FBI Director Christopher A. Wray on August 14, 2018. Previously, John G. Perren, who was appointed by then FBI Director Robert Mueller on May 10, 2012, held the position.

Organization
The Weapons of Mass Destruction Directorate has three sections:
 Intelligence and Analysis Section 
 Countermeasures and Preparedness Section
 Investigations and Operations Section

See also
Central Intelligence Agency
MI5
Counter Terrorism Command (SO15)
Direction de la surveillance du territoire (DST)
Interpol

References

External links
Official Federal Bureau of Investigation website

Federal Bureau of Investigation